Acritohippus is an extinct genus of equine from North America.

References

Miocene horses
Miocene odd-toed ungulates
Fossil taxa described in 1995
Miocene mammals of North America
Prehistoric placental genera